Manoj Kumar Meghwal (born 1976) is an Indian politician from the Indian National Congress and a member of the Rajasthan Legislative Assembly. He was elected to represent the Sujangarh constituency in a by-election held on 17 April 2021 following the death of his father, Bhanwarlal Meghwal, who was the former sitting member of the constituency.

References

Rajasthani politicians
Rajasthan MLAs 2018–2023
Indian National Congress politicians
Living people
1976 births
Indian National Congress politicians from Rajasthan